Mourad Ben Embarek (- 2011) was a Moroccan modernist architect. He was a leader in the reconstruction of Agadir and published the first post-independence architecture magazine in Morocco: a+u.

Life 

In 1961, he took over for Abdeslam Faraoui and directed the Service of Urbanism, remaining as director until 1966.

Notable works 

 Technopark, Casablanca
 Terminal 1 of Mohammed V International Airport, Casablanca
 Atlas Tower, Casablanca

References 

Moroccan architects
Modernist architects
2011 deaths